La Unión District is one of ten districts of the province Piura in Peru. The district was created by the law Ley N° 5951 of December 28, 1927 during the government of President Augusto Leguía.

References

External links
 INEI Perú

1927 establishments in Peru